En el viejo Buenos Aires is a 1942 Argentine film directed by Antonio Momplet.

Cast
 Luis Aldás
 Amelia Bence
 Angel Boffa
 Rosa Catá
 Orestes Caviglia
 Alberto Contreras
 Raúl del Valle

External links
 

1942 films
Films directed by Antonio Momplet
1940s Spanish-language films
Argentine black-and-white films
1942 musical comedy films
Argentine musical comedy films
1940s Argentine films